Bart van Brakel (born 5 April 1987) is a Dutch footballer who played as a midfielder for DUNO.

Club career
A holding midfielder, van Brakel formerly played for NEC, FC Eindhoven, FC Den Bosch and moved to SC Cambuur in June 2013.

He joined FC Oss in summer 2014, only to quit playing professionally in 2014 to focus on a career outside football. He went on to play amateur football for DOVO. In April 2017, he joined DUNO.

References

External links
 Voetbal International profile 

1987 births
Living people
People from Wageningen
Footballers from Gelderland
Association football midfielders
Dutch footballers
NEC Nijmegen players
FC Eindhoven players
FC Den Bosch players
SC Cambuur players
TOP Oss players
VV DOVO players
VV DUNO players
Eerste Divisie players
Eredivisie players